Eielson Peninsula is a rugged, mainly snow-covered peninsula,  long in an east–west direction and averaging  wide, lying between Smith Inlet and Lehrke Inlet on the east coast of Palmer Land. The rocky north wall of this peninsula is probably the feature which, on his flight of December 20, 1928, Sir Hubert Wilkins sighted and named "Cape Eielson" from a position above Stefansson Strait (Wilkins gave the name to the farthest south rock outcrop seen from this position). This rock wall is conspicuous in the aerial photographs of the peninsula taken by members of the United States Antarctic Service in 1940 from an aerial position at the north side of Stefansson Strait. The peninsula is named for Carl B. Eielson, the pilot on Wilkins' flight of 1928.

See also 
Elder Bluff

References 

Peninsulas of Palmer Land